Vitaliy Kyrylenko (also known as , Vitaliy Kirilenko; April 25, 1968) is a retired long jumper from Ukraine, best known for winning the bronze medal in the men's long jump event at the 1993 World Championships in Stuttgart, Germany.

References

 Vitaliy Kyrylenko at Sports-Reference.com

1968 births
Living people
Ukrainian male long jumpers
Athletes (track and field) at the 1996 Summer Olympics
Olympic athletes of Ukraine
World Athletics Championships medalists
Universiade medalists in athletics (track and field)
Universiade bronze medalists for Ukraine
Medalists at the 1993 Summer Universiade